) is a popular song written by Wayne Shanklin.  A 1977 recording by The Manhattan Transfer was an international hit, reaching #1 in the UK Singles Chart,  and Australia.

Original version
In 1958 the husband and wife team of Art and Dotty Todd were the resident act at the Chapman Park Hotel in Los Angeles. The duo had charted in the UK in 1953 with "Broken Wings" (#6) but were known in their native United States as veterans of the California lounge circuit; the Todds also sang on their own radio show. Art Todd recalls how Wayne Shanklin gave the duo the song "Chanson D'Amour": "Wayne Shanklin stopped us one day and said, 'I've got a great song for you.'" Shanklin produced a demo of Art and Dotty Todd singing "Chanson D'Amour" which was shopped to Era Records, who released the demo track as a single. According to Art Todd: "The airplay was just sensational. This was just at the beginning of rock 'n' roll and the old-time DJs hated rock 'n' roll and they jumped on our song." Art and Dotty Todd's "Chanson D'Amour" was a Top Ten hit and reached #6 in April 1958, and crossed over to the R&B chart and reached #9.

Manhattan Transfer recording
The Manhattan Transfer remade "Chanson D'Amour" for their 1976 Richard Perry-produced Coming Out album. The song came to the group's producer Richard Perry's attention as a demo on cassette. The group and Richard listened, and immediately decided to record the song. Janis Siegel sang the lead with an Edith Piaf sound, and it was recorded in one take.

Overlooked in the United States in its single release, the Manhattan Transfer's version of "Chanson D'Amour" became a European hit, breaking out on the charts in France at the start of 1977 to peak there at #8: the track subsequently became a hit in Germany (#20), the Netherlands (#6), Norway (#1 for two weeks) and Switzerland (#6). In the English-speaking world, "Chanson D'Amour" afforded the Manhattan Transfer a chart-topping hit, reaching #1 in March 1977 in both the UK – for three weeks – and Ireland. It was also a hit in Australia (#9), New Zealand (#14) and South Africa (#14). "Chanson D'Amour" proved to be the Manhattan Transfer's most widespread international success, despite being only moderately successful in the group's native United States, where the track registered on Easy Listening chart in Billboard at #16.

Personnel
Manhattan Transfer
Tim Hauser, Janis Siegel – vocals, arranger
Laurel Massé, Alan Paul – vocals

Musicians
John Barnes – piano
Steve Paietta – accordion
Ira Newborn, Ben Benay – guitar
Andy Muson – bass
Jim Gordon – drums

Charts

Other versions
The Fontane Sisters recorded a version of "Chanson D'Amour" which charted concurrently with the Art and Dotty Todd version, with the Fontane Sisters version peaking at #12 and affording the group their last major hit (the group would have one more entry in the Billboard Hot 100: "Jealous Heart" at #94). In the UK both the Art and Dotty Todd and Fontane Sisters versions of "Chanson D'Amour" were issued along with domestic covers by Tony Brent and Steve Martin.

Also in 1958, Belgian singer Angèle Durand recorded a version which rendered the English lyrics in German; this "Chanson D'Amour" became Durand's signature song. Wendy Van Wanten remade this version in 1998.

In 1959 a Finnish rendering of "Chanson D'Amour" was recorded by the vocal group Jokerit: this version was remade in 1977 – subsequent to the success of the Manhattan Transfer version – by Ami Aspelund, and also by Lea Laven, and by Silhuetit (fi) (album Jos Mulle Sydämesi Annat).

The song had made an interim Easy Listening chart appearance in 1966, when a remake by the Lettermen reached #8.

Sandler and Young remade "Chanson D'Amour" for their 1967 album On the Move.

"Chanson D'Amour" was also sung by The Muppets in episode 28 of "The Muppet Show" . In the song, Crazy Harry, who sang the line "Ra-ta-da-ta-da," proceeded to blow up the entire set.

In 1978 "Chanson D'Amour" was remade by the Nolans for their album 20 Giant Hits, and also by Liz Damon's Orient Express for their album Heaven in My Heart.

The Frank Farian-produced disco group La Mama had a 1981 single release with a remake of "Chanson D'Amour".

In 1993 The King's Singers recorded their arrangement of "Chanson D'Amour" on their album titled by the same name, Chanson D'Amour.

The song was remade by In-Grid on her 2004 album La Vie en Rose.

Song in popular culture
A version by cast member Mike Berry was central to "The Pop Star," the series finale of the BBC sitcom "Are You Being Served?", first screened on 1 April 1985.
The song is briefly excerpted in The Beatles song "All You Need Is Love" .
The song is featured in the 1989 film I, Madman.

References

UK Singles Chart number-one singles
Number-one singles in Norway
The Fontane Sisters songs
The Lettermen songs
1958 singles
1966 singles
1977 singles
Song recordings produced by Richard Perry
Songs written by Wayne Shanklin
The Manhattan Transfer songs
The Muppets songs
1958 songs
Capitol Records singles
Atlantic Records singles
Irish Singles Chart number-one singles
Macaronic songs